The Polomet is a river in Valdaysky, Krestetsky, and Demyansky Districts of Novgorod Oblast in Russia. It is a right tributary of the Pola. The principal tributary of the Polomet is the Luzhonka (left).

The source of the Polomet is in Lake Russkoye in the Valdai Hills. The upper course of the Polomet is located within Valdaysky National Park. The river flows west, then turns north. At the selo of Yazhelbitsy the Polomet makes a turn, crosses into Krestetsky District, returns to Valdaysky District, and crosses into Demyansky District. In Demyansky District, it flows southwest. In the selo of Lychkovo, it crosses the railroad which connects Bologoye and Pskov via Staraya Russa. The mouth of the Polomet is close to the village of Kostkovo (which is located on the left bank of the Pola).

The river basin of the Polomet comprises the western part of Valdaysky District, including some of the lakes in Valdaysky National Park, the southern part of Krestetsky District, and the northwestern part of Demyansky District.

The Polomet is attractive for kayaking and rafting. In summer, the stretch between Lychkovo and the mouth is used., in the spring, the stretch upstream from Yazhelbitsy is used.

Until the 1990s, the Polomet was used for timber rafting.

References

External links
 

Rivers of Novgorod Oblast